Allison Beth Goertz (born March 2, 1991) is an American comedy musician, writer and former editor for Mad magazine.  Goertz is known for her satirical songs based on various pop culture topics.  Her videos were originally posted on YouTube under the name of "Cossbysweater", which has been changed to simply "Allie Goertz".

Early life 
Goertz grew up in Long Beach, California, the daughter of an elementary school teacher mother and a web graphic designer father.

Career 
In December 2015, Goertz released a concept album based on the Adult Swim series Rick and Morty, Sad Dance Songs, with the album's cover emulating the animation and logo of the series. The album was made possible through Kickstarter. She is co-host, along with Julia Prescott, of Everything's Coming Up Simpsons (formerly Everything's Coming Up Podcast), a podcast dedicated to The Simpsons.

Subjects of her songs have included the film The Room, the character Milhouse from the television show The Simpsons, and the game Dungeons & Dragons. Her style has been compared to that of Bo Burnham.

Affiliations and memberships 
Goertz has served as a social media producer for shows including @midnight for Comedy Central. In 2018, Goertz became an editor at Mad magazine, leaving in June 2019, midway through production of issue #9.

She is also a canvasser for the Democratic Socialists of America.

In popular culture 
The band Nerf Herder released a song entitled "Allie Goertz" on their 2016 album Rockingham.

References

External links 

1991 births
Living people
21st-century American comedians
21st-century American singers
21st-century American women writers
21st-century American women singers
American comedy musicians
American comedy writers
American novelty song performers
American women comedians
American women podcasters
American podcasters
American YouTubers
California State University, Long Beach alumni
Members of the Democratic Socialists of America
Mad (magazine) people
Musicians from Long Beach, California
Nerd-folk musicians
Singer-songwriters from California